Phalaenopsis × rolfeana is a species of orchid native to the Philippines. It is a hybrid of Phalaenopsis equestris and Phalaenopsis sanderiana.

Etymology
The specific epithet rolfeana honours the English botanist Robert Allen Rolfe, who specialised on the study of orchids. He had first described this taxon as Phalaenopsis × hebe, which however was a Nomen illegitimum and thus not accepted.

References 

rolfeana
Orchid hybrids
Hybrid plants
Plant nothospecies
Interspecific plant hybrids
Plants described in 1969
Orchids of the Philippines